Hearon is a surname. Notable people with the surname include:

 Caleb Hearon (born 1995), American comedian, writer, and actor
 Shelby Hearon (1931–2016), American writer
 Steve Hearon (born 1953), American professional boxer and convicted serial killer
 Todd Hearon, American poet